Çatalköy can refer to:

 Çatalköy, Bismil
 the Turkish name for Agios Epiktitos